Sir John Vanden-Bempde-Johnstone, 2nd Baronet (28 August 1799 – 24 February 1869) was a British Member of Parliament.

Vanden-Bempde-Johnstone was the son of Sir Richard Vanden-Bempde-Johnstone, 1st Baronet. He succeeded as second Baronet in 1807, at the age of seven, on the death of his father. In 1830 he was elected to the House of Commons for Yorkshire as a Whig, a seat he held until the constituency was abolished in 1832. The latter year he was returned for Scarborough. During the 1835 parliament he defected from the Whigs to the Conservatives, and lost his seat in 1837, but regained it in 1841, and continued to represent the constituency until his death 28 years later. However, from 1857 he sat as a Liberal.

Vanden-Bempde-Johnstone married Louisa Augusta Venables-Vernon-Harcourt (1804–1869), daughter of the Most Reverend Edward Harcourt, Archbishop of York.

He was elected as a Vice-President of the Yorkshire Philosophical Society in 1824.

He died, from injuries in a hunting accident, in February 1869, aged 69, and was succeeded in the baronetcy by his eldest son Harcourt, who also succeeded him as Member of Parliament for Scarborough and who was elevated to the peerage as Baron Derwent in 1881. Lady Vanden-Bempde-Johnstone survived her husband by less than half a year, and died in August 1869.

Notes

References
Kidd, Charles, Williamson, David (editors). Debrett's Peerage and Baronetage (1990 edition). New York: St Martin's Press, 1990,

External links 
 

Vanden-Bempde-Johnstone, John, 2nd Baronet
Vanden-Bempde-Johnstone, John, 2nd Baronet
Vanden-Bempde-Johnstone, John, 2nd Baronet
Whig (British political party) MPs for English constituencies
Conservative Party (UK) MPs for English constituencies
UK MPs 1830–1831
UK MPs 1831–1832
UK MPs 1832–1835
UK MPs 1835–1837
UK MPs 1837–1841
UK MPs 1841–1847
UK MPs 1847–1852
UK MPs 1852–1857
UK MPs 1857–1859
UK MPs 1859–1865
UK MPs 1865–1868
UK MPs 1868–1874
Politicians from Scarborough, North Yorkshire
Members of the Yorkshire Philosophical Society
Liberal Party (UK) MPs for English constituencies
Accidental deaths in England